Kristján Vattnes (2 September 1916 – 31 December 1992) was an Icelandic athlete. He competed in the men's javelin throw at the 1936 Summer Olympics.

References

1916 births
1992 deaths
Athletes (track and field) at the 1936 Summer Olympics
Kristján Vattnes
Kristján Vattnes